The CMLL Universal Championship 2011 (Campeonato Universal in Spanish) was a professional wrestling tournament produced by the Consejo Mundial de Lucha Libre (CMLL) promotion, which took place over three shows between September 2, 2011, and September 16, 2011, in Arena México, Mexico City, Mexico. The CMLL Universal Championship is an annual tournament of CMLL Champions that was first held in 2009. The 2011 tournament was the first one to include a non-CMLL Champion as New Japan Pro-Wrestling's IWGP Heavyweight Champion Hiroshi Tanahashi also took part in the tournament.

Background
The tournament featured 15 professional wrestling matches under single-elimination tournament rules, which means that wrestlers were eliminated when they lose a match. There were no specific storylines that build to the tournament, which has been held annually since 2009. All male "non-regional" CMLL champions at the time of the tournament were involved in the tournament with the exception of the reigning CMLL World Mini-Estrella and Mexican National Lightweight Champions, who have never taken part in the tournament. Regionally promoted championships such as the CMLL Arena Coliseo Tag Team Championship and the Occidente championships promoted in Guadalajara, Jalisco were not included in the tournament; only titles that have been defended in CMLL's main venue Arena Mexico were included. The tournament was divided into two qualifying blocks, which took take place on September 2 and September 9, while the finals took place on September 16, 2011.

2011 Universal Championship tournament
When CMLL announced the 2011 tournament the following champions were eligible to participate:

Reigning Universal Champion Jushin Thunder Liger did not take part in the tournament; instead, his spot was filled by fellow New Japan Pro-Wrestling representative and reigning IWGP Heavyweight Champion Hiroshi Tanahashi.

Block A
Block A took place on September 2, 2011, and featured eight champions wrestling for a place in the finals.

Block B
Block B took place on September 9, 2011, and featured eight champions wrestling for a place in the finals.

Finals
The finals of the tournament took place on September 16, 2011, and saw La Sombra defeat Averno two falls to one to become the 2011 Universal Champion.

References

2011 in professional wrestling
CMLL Universal Championship